Calusa Nature Center and Planetarium is a non-profit environmental education organization in Fort Myers, Florida.

Located on 105 acres, the Center includes a natural history museum with live native and teaching animals, and exhibits about the animals, plants and environment of Southwest Florida.  The 44'(13.4-meter) diameter planetarium seats 90 and features fulldome full-surround planetarium shows 7 days/week, changing the shows on a monthly basis; they have a collection of meteorites in their display area. The planetarium presents evening laser shows quarterly and Calusa Nature Center and Planetarium staff do educational outreach to local schools and civic groups. There are three nature trails, the planetarium, a butterfly house, and a raptor aviary with rehabilitated (but un-releasable) birds of prey. There is also a gift shop, meeting space, classroom, and picnic areas.

References

External links
Calusa Nature Center website

Buildings and structures in Fort Myers, Florida
Nature centers in Florida
Tourist attractions in Fort Myers, Florida
Planetaria in the United States
Museums in Lee County, Florida
Natural history museums in Florida